Jimmy Santiago Paredes Terrero (born November 25, 1988), is a Dominican professional baseball utility player for the Frederick Atlantic League Team of the Atlantic League of Professional Baseball. Paredes previously played in Major League Baseball (MLB) for the Houston Astros, Kansas City Royals, Baltimore Orioles, Toronto Blue Jays, and Philadelphia Phillies, in Nippon Professional Baseball (NPB) for the Chiba Lotte Marines, and in the KBO League for the Doosan Bears.

Baseball career

Minor league career
Paredes was signed as an amateur free agent with the New York Yankees.  He made his professional debut in 2007 with the Dominican Summer Yankees 1. He came to America for the 2008 season and played with the Gulf Coast League Yankees. He played 2009 with the Staten Island Yankees of the Class A-Short Season New York–Penn League, where he was an All-Star, batting .302 with 23 steals in 54 games. He started 2010 with the Charleston RiverDogs of the Class A South Atlantic League (SAL). At the July 30 trade deadline, the Yankees traded Paredes with Mark Melancon to the Houston Astros for Lance Berkman.

The Astros assigned Paredes to the Lexington Legends of the SAL. After the season, the Astros added Paredes to their 40-man roster to protect him from the Rule 5 draft. He signed a one-year, $414,000 deal before the season started. He started the 2011 season with the Corpus Christi Hooks of the Class AA Texas League, where he was an All-Star, splitting time at second and third base, batting .271 with 29 steals and 41 runs batted in (RBIs).

Houston Astros and the waiver wire
On August 1, 2011, the Astros promoted Paredes to the major leagues to play third base, replacing the struggling Chris Johnson.  In his first major league at bat, Paredes hit a two-run triple, becoming the first player in franchise history to triple in his first major league plate appearance.

In 2012, he batted .189, and in 2013 he batted .192.

After the 2013 season, the Astros removed Paredes from their 40-man roster, placing him on waivers. He was claimed by the Miami Marlins. He was designated for assignment on February 7, 2014.

On February 15 he was claimed off waivers by the Baltimore Orioles. On February 17, he was claimed off waivers by the Kansas City Royals. On May 28, 2014, while playing for the Triple-A Omaha Storm Chasers, Paredes had an 8-RBI game in which he hit for the cycle. The Royals designated Paredes for assignment on July 16, after trading for Jason Frasor.

Baltimore Orioles
Paredes was acquired by the Baltimore Orioles on July 24, 2014. On September 12, 2014, Paredes hit his first career walk off hit, a double off of New York Yankees pitcher Adam Warren in a 2–1 victory.

Paredes was not seen as a top contender for the Orioles' 25-man roster going into the 2015 season. However, Paredes had an extremely impressive spring training, batting .364/.368/.636 with seven doubles, a triple, two homers and 12 RBIs. After a short stint on the disabled list to start the season, Paredes was activated to the Orioles' roster on April 18, 2015.

Through July 20, 2015, Paredes hit .294/.326/.463, with ten home runs and 39 RBIs. Despite his hot start, Paredes cooled off dramatically during the final months of the season, and he hit .275/.310/.416, with ten home runs, 42 RBIs, 17 doubles, 2 triples, 46 runs scored, and he collected exactly 100 hits. Paredes primarily played DH during the 2015 campaign, playing 81 games at the position, 11 as a pinch-hitter, eight as a third baseman, six at second base, two in right field, and one game as a pinch-runner and left fielder.

Toronto Blue Jays
On May 16, 2016, Paredes was claimed off waivers by the Toronto Blue Jays. He was designated for assignment on May 30. He played in 7 games for the Blue Jays, and hit .267 with one home run and two RBI.

Philadelphia Phillies
On June 1, 2016, Paredes was traded to the Philadelphia Phillies for cash considerations or a player to be named later.

Chiba Lotte Marines
On January 5, 2017, Paredes signed a one-year, $1.2 million contract with the Chiba Lotte Marines of Nippon Professional Baseball.

Doosan Bears
Paredes signed a one-year, $800,000 contract with the Doosan Bears on December 1, 2017. He was released on June 1, 2018.

Lancaster Barnstormers
On July 23, 2018, Paredes signed with the Lancaster Barnstormers of the Atlantic League of Professional Baseball.

Somerset Patriots
On March 19, 2019, Paredes was traded to the Somerset Patriots of the Atlantic League of Professional Baseball. He re-signed with the club for the 2020 season, which was later canceled due to the COVID-19 pandemic.

West Virginia Power
On March 5, 2021, Paredes signed with the West Virginia Power of the Atlantic League of Professional Baseball. In 32 games for the Power, Paredes slashed .317/.433/.529 with 5 home runs and 20 RBI before being released on July 9.

Toros de Tijuana
On July 18, 2021, Paredes signed with the Toros de Tijuana of the Mexican League. In 12 games, he slashed .340/.389/.520 with 2 home runs and 4 RBIs before being released on August 11, 2021.

West Virginia Power (second stint)
On August 19, 2021, Paredes re-signed with the West Virginia Power of the Atlantic League of Professional Baseball. He became a free agent following the season.

Wild Health Genomes
On February 7, 2022, Paredes signed with the Wild Health Genomes of the Atlantic League of Professional Baseball. Paredes appeared in 106 games for the Genomes, hitting .283/.345/.493 with 18 home runs and 68 RBI. He became a free agent following the season.

Frederick Atlantic League Team
On February 27, 2023, Paredes signed with the Frederick Atlantic League Team in the Atlantic League of Professional Baseball.

References

External links

Jimmy Paredes at Baseball Almanac
Jimmy Paredes at Astros Daily

1988 births
Living people
Baltimore Orioles players
Charleston RiverDogs players
Chiba Lotte Marines players
Corpus Christi Hooks players
Dominican Republic expatriate baseball players in Canada
Dominican Republic expatriate baseball players in Japan
Dominican Republic expatriate baseball players in the United States
Dominican Republic expatriate baseball players in South Korea
Dominican Summer League Yankees players
Gigantes del Cibao players
Gulf Coast Yankees players
Houston Astros players
Kansas City Royals players
KBO League outfielders
Lexington Legends players
Major League Baseball players from the Dominican Republic
Nippon Professional Baseball outfielders
Norfolk Tides players
Oklahoma City RedHawks players
Omaha Storm Chasers players
People from Bajos de Haina
Philadelphia Phillies players
Somerset Patriots players
Staten Island Yankees players
Toronto Blue Jays players
West Virginia Power players
Doosan Bears players
Leones del Escogido players